is a Japanese manga artist. She is best known for the manga series The Kindaichi Case Files and Detective School Q. In 1995, she received the Kodansha Manga Award for her work on The Kindaichi Case Files.

References

External links
 
 Profile at The Ultimate Manga Page 
 Official Blog

Living people
1965 births
Manga artists from Saitama Prefecture
Winner of Kodansha Manga Award (Shōnen)
People from Saitama (city)